Al-Ittihad Jeddah is a basketball club based in the Red Sea port city of Jeddah in Makkah Province, Saudi Arabia that plays in the Saudi Premier League.

Achievements
Saudi Premier League champion: 1996, 1997, 1998, 1999, 2000, 2001, 2004, 2005, 2006, 2007, 2009, 2010, 2011, 2013, 2016, 2017
Alnokhbah Championship winner: 1996, 2000, 2001, 2002, 2004, 2005, 2007, 2009, 2012, 2014
Saudi Arabia Prince Faisal bin Fahad Cup winner: 2004, 2005, 2006, 2017
Arab Club Basketball Championship:1st (2004); 2nd (2006); 3rd (2007); 4th (2005)
FIBA Asia Champions Cup: 1st (2001); 2nd (2000, 2002)
Gulf Club Championships winner : 1997, 1998, 1999, 2000, 2005

Notable players

 Mahmoud Abdul-Rauf
 Jermaine Beal
 God Shammgod

References

External links
Team profile at Asia-Basket.com
2006–07 team highlights

Basketball teams established in 1927
Basketball teams in Saudi Arabia
Sport in Jeddah